Primary Care Service Areas are geographic areas that are self-sufficient markets of primary care. These areas are designed in a manner such that the majority of patients living in these areas use primary care services form within the area. This ensures that any geographic targeting of policies and resources reach the patients they are meant for. These geographies have been created in Australia, United States  and Switzerland  using big data and Geographic information systems. In Australia, while they have been developed for the state of New South Wales, they have not found application among policymakers, where, as of 2016 much larger geographies called Primary Health Networks are used for primary care management. However, they have found an especially wide audience amongst policymakers and researchers in the United States,  where they were first developed. Thus for example the Health Resources and Services Administration uses them to designate areas of workforce shortage. Primary Care Service Areas are thus for example an appropriate geography for measuring  primary care physician supply or geographic access to General practitioners.

See also
Bonded medical place
Gravity model of migration
two-step floating catchment area (2SFCA) method

References

Geography
Spatial analysis
Accessibility
Urban studies and planning terminology